Rigaud of Assier was a medieval Bishop of Winchester.

Rigaud was nominated on 26 November 1319 and consecrated on 16 November 1320. He died on 12 April 1323.

Citations

References

 

Bishops of Winchester
1323 deaths
Year of birth unknown
14th-century English Roman Catholic bishops